Porlieria chilensis is a plant that occurs in South America. In fact, all genus members are small trees or shrubs found on the South American continent. An example occurrence of P. chilensis is in the arid forested area of central Chile, where it occurs in association with the endangered Chilean wine palm, Jubaea chilensis.

References
 C. Michael Hogan. 2008. Chilean Wine Palm: Jubaea chilensis, GlobalTwitcher.com, ed. Nicklas Stromberg
 Samuel James Record and Clayton Dissinger Mell. 1924. Timbers of Tropical America, Yale university press, 610 pages
  (Spanish)

Line notes

chilensis
Trees of Chile
Drought-tolerant trees